Paenibacillus koreensis is a bacterium. It produces an iturin-like antifungal antibiotic. It is facultatively anaerobic and its type strain is YC300T (= KCTC 2393T, KCCM 40903T).

References

Further reading

External links

Type strain of Paenibacillus koreensis at BacDive -  the Bacterial Diversity Metadatabase

Paenibacillaceae
Bacteria described in 2000